Harburg is an electoral constituency (German: Wahlkreis) represented in the Bundestag. It elects one member via first-past-the-post voting. Under the current constituency numbering system, it is designated as constituency 36. It is located in northern Lower Saxony, comprising the district of Harburg.

Harburg was created for the 1980 federal election. It was abolished in 2002 and re-established in the 2009 federal election. Since 2021, it has been represented by Svenja Stadler of the Social Democratic Party (SPD).

Geography
Harburg is located in northern Lower Saxony. As of the 2021 federal election, it comprises the Harburg district.

History
Harburg was created in 1980 and contained parts of the abolished constituency of Harburg – Soltau. In its first incarnation, it was constituency 35 in the numbering system, and comprised the Harburg district. It was abolished in the 2002 election, and divided between the new constituencies of Soltau-Fallingbostel – Winsen Luhe and Lüchow-Dannenberg – Lüneburg.

The constituency was re-established in the 2009 election. It was constituency number 37. Since the 2013 election, it has been constituency number 36. Its borders have not changed since its re-establishment.

Members
The constituency was first held by Herbert Helmrich of the Christian Democratic Union (CDU), who served from 1980 until 1994. He was succeeded by fellow CDU member Rudolf Meyer, who served until 1998. In 1998, Monika Griefahn of the Social Democratic Party (SPD) won the constituency, serving until its abolition in the next Bundestag term. After its re-establishment in the 2009 election, Michael Grosse-Brömer of the CDU won the constituency. Svenja Stadler regained it for the SPD in 2021.

Election results

2021 election

2017 election

2013 election

2009 election

References

Federal electoral districts in Lower Saxony
1980 establishments in West Germany
Constituencies established in 1980